The Catholic Church of Yerkalo also Yanjing Catholic Church is a Christian church located in Yerkalo (Tibetan: Tsakalo, Wylie: tsha kha lho, meaning "salt pit"), a village between 2650 and 3109 meters above sea level at the southern end of Markham County (Chamdo, Tibet Autonomous Region) in present-day China.

History 
It was founded in 1865 by Félix Biet and Auguste Desgodins, French missionaries of the Paris Foreign Missions Society. The mission was based in Xinjiang but some of its missionaries opted to proselytize in Tibet. Within a few years, Tibetan marauders supported by Buddhist lamas killed 10 priests and destroyed all but one Catholic mission which was based in Yanjing.  Bringing with them thirty-five of their faithful,  having been expelled from the main mission of Bonga in Yerkalo, conquered by the Qing dynasty, were legally established in some plots of land with the complicity of the population and silence of local officials. Historically, China and Tibet disputed the possession of the Yerkalo saline wells, which passed from one side or the other of the Sino-Tibetan border. Finally, in 1932, the village was placed under the Tibetan Government in Lhasa.

According to the Xinhua news agency, the establishment of a small Catholic parish in Tibet was not an easy task. Enmity from the local Tibetan Buddhist monks from the Karma Gon Monastery culminated in the killing of one of Father Biet's successors, Maurice Tornay in August 11, 1949.

Architecture 
The exterior of the church features traditional Tibetan design while the interior has European Gothic designs. The church holds weekly services in the Tibetan language. As of 2014, the church had one priest, two sisters and serves a estimated 559 worshippers around the area.

See also
Christianity in Tibet
Catholic Church of Lhasa
Catholic Church in Sichuan
History of European exploration in Tibet

References

Roman Catholic churches in Tibet
Chamdo
Catholic Church in Sichuan